Forever Blue is the eleventh album of Blue System, released in 1995 by BMG Ariola and produced by Dieter Bohlen. The album contains eleven tracks.

Track listing

Credits 
 Dieter Bohlen – lead vocals, producer, arranger, lyrics
 Rolf Köhler – refrain vocals, chorus
 Detlef Wiedeke – chorus
 Michael Scholz – chorus
 Luis Rodriguez – Co-producer, engineering

Recording: Jeopark by Jeo and T. Brötzmann
Keyboards: T. Brötzmann and Werner Becker
Publishing: BMG Records
Design: Ariola Werkstadt
Photography: Kramer and Giogoli

Charts

Certifications

References

External links

Blue System albums
1995 albums
Bertelsmann Music Group albums